Pan Myaing Lal Ka Oo Yin Mhu is a 1989 Burmese drama film, directed by Maung Tin Oo starring Kyaw Hein, Nay Aung and Theingi Htun.

Cast
Kyaw Hein as Tar Tee
Nay Aung as Myint Htway
Theingi Htun as Nyo Ma

Award

References

1989 films
1980s Burmese-language films
Burmese drama films
Films shot in Myanmar
1989 drama films